KXOF-CD (channel 31) is a low-power, Class A television station in Laredo, Texas, United States, affiliated with the Fox network. It is owned by Entravision Communications alongside Univision affiliate KLDO-TV (channel 27) and Class A UniMás affiliate KETF-CD (channel 39). The three stations share studios on Bob Bullock Loop in Laredo; KXOF-CD's transmitter is located on Shea Street north of downtown.

KXOF-CD and Harlingen-based KFXV (channel 60), which serves the Rio Grande Valley to the southeast, use the same newscast called Fox News South Texas which is divided into two segments; Laredo news (originating from KXOF) and Rio Grande Valley news (originating from KFXV).

History
The station began as K15EZ on channel 15 on July 28, 1997, moving to channel 25 on August 6, 1999 as K25GN. From 1999 to 2005, the station was KZLD-LP. Entravision bought the station in 2005, simultaneously switching the station to a Spanish-language Telefutura network as KETF-CA. In 2009, KETF-CA went off the air due to XHBR transmitting digitally on channel 25.1. In June of that year, KETF-CA applied for a permit to start transmitting digitally on channel 31.1. In January 2010, the permit was granted. The station changed its call sign to KETF-CD on January 3, 2011.

KETF-CD and its sister station KXOF-CD swapped call signs on December 13, 2018.

Subchannels
The station's digital signal is multiplexed:

References

External links

KXOF 31 Website

XOF-CD
Television channels and stations established in 1999
Low-power television stations in the United States
Entravision Communications stations
1999 establishments in Texas
Fox network affiliates
MyNetworkTV affiliates